Operette is a musical in two acts composed, written and produced by Noël Coward.  The show is a period piece, set in the year 1906 at the fictional "Jubilee" theatre.  The story concerns an ageing Viennese operetta star, who warns the young ingenue not to marry a nobleman.

The piece premiered in 1938.  Coward's attempt to follow up the mittel-European nostalgia of his hit operetta Bitter Sweet (1929) was not a success and ran for only 132 performances.  It nevertheless contained songs that endured, in Coward's cabaret act and elsewhere, such as "The Stately Homes of England".

Production
Operette was first performed at the Manchester Opera House, from 17 February 1938 to 12 March 1938.  It then transferred to His Majesty's Theatre in London on 16 March 1938, closing on 9 July 1938.

There are 35 speaking parts in the musical, and in the original production there was a company of 80. The show is a period piece, set in the year 1906 at the fictional "Jubilee" theatre.  Coward directed the production. Wood and Massary were supported by Griffith Jones as the young peer who falls in love with the heroine, and Irene Vanbrugh as his mother.

Synopsis
Cast in an Edwardian musical comedy, The Model Maid, Liesl Haren, a fading Viennese operetta star, has one more chance at stardom.  Young Rozanne Grey, a member of the sextet of The Model Maid, falls in love with Nigel Vaynham, a nobleman serving in the army.  Liesl counsels the younger woman not to marry him.  Rozanne gains the leading role and stardom, but Nigel returns to the army, realising that a marriage to an actress would destroy his social reputation.

Principal roles and original cast
Maisie Welbey – Phyllis Monkman
Eddie Gosling – Edward Cooper
Grace Menteith – Pamela Randell
Rozanne Gray – Peggy Wood
Liesl Haren – Fritzi Massary
Paul Trevor – Max Oldaker
Elsie Jewell – Muriel Baron
Nigel Vaynham – Griffith Jones
David Messiter – Peter Vokes
Lady Messiter – Irene Vanbrugh

Musical numbers
Prologue
The Opening Chorus
Pom-pom
Countess Mitzi
Dearest love
Foolish virgins
The stately homes of England
Where are the songs we sung?
The island of Bollamazoo
Prologue, Act II
Sing for joy
My dear Miss Dale
Operette

The Noël Coward Society's website, drawing on performing statistics from the publishers and the Performing Rights Society, ranks "The stately homes of England" as among Coward's ten most popular songs.

Notes

Musicals by Noël Coward
Fiction set in 1906
1938 musicals
British musicals